Nuttallanthus is a genus of four species of herbaceous annuals and perennials that was traditionally placed in the foxglove family Scrophulariaceae. Due to new genetic research, it has now been placed in the vastly expanded family Plantaginaceae. Three species of Nuttallanthus are native to North America and one to South America.  Nuttallanthus was until the 1980s included in a wider circumscription of the genus Linaria, a genus now considered restricted to the Old World.

The members of this genus are known in English as toadflax, a name shared with several other related genera. The scientific name honors Thomas Nuttall.

The North American species do not appear to form interspecific hybrids at all.  The most common mode of reproduction is self-fertilization, with occasional fertilization by another plant of the same species.

Closely related genera include the Linaria (Eurasian toadflaxes), Antirrhinum (snapdragons) and Cymbalaria (ivy-leaved toadflaxes).

References

External links
USDA Plant Profile: Nuttallanthus

Plantaginaceae genera
Plantaginaceae